Renfrewshire South is a constituency of the Scottish Parliament covering parts of the council areas of Renfrewshire and East Renfrewshire. It elects one Member of the Scottish Parliament (MSP) by the first past the post method of election. It forms one of ten constituencies in the West Scotland electoral region, which also elects seven additional members to produce a form of proportional representation for the region as a whole.

The constituency was created for the 2011 Scottish Parliament election from parts of the former constituencies of West Renfrewshire, Paisley South and Paisley North constituencies. It also contains some areas of East Renfrewshire that were formerly part of the Eastwood constituency. The seat has been held by Tom Arthur of the Scottish National Party since the 2016 Scottish Parliament election.

Electoral region 

The other nine constituencies of the West Scotland region are Clydebank and Milngavie, Cunninghame North, Cunninghame South, Dumbarton, Eastwood, Greenock and Inverclyde, Paisley, Renfrewshire North and West and Strathkelvin and Bearsden.

The region covers part of the Argyll and Bute council area, the East Dunbartonshire council area, the East Renfrewshire council area, the Inverclyde council area, North Ayrshire council area, the Renfrewshire council area and the West Dunbartonshire council area.

Constituency boundaries and council area 

The Renfrewshire South constituency contains portions of both Renfrewshire and East Renfrewshire and was formed from the following local electoral wards:

In full:
Barrhead, Liboside and Uplawmoor (East Renfrewshire)
Johnstone North, Kilbarchan, Howwood and Lochwinnoch (Renfrewshire)
In part:
Johnstone South and Elderslie (Renfrewshire; shared with Paisley constituency)
Newton Mearns North and Neilston (East Renfrewshire; shared with Eastwood constituency)
Houston, Crosslee and Linwood (Renfrewshire; shared with Renfrewshire North and West constituency)

The rest of Renfrewshire is covered by the Paisley and Renfrewshire North and West seats, whilst the rest of East Renfrewshire forms the Eastwood seat.

Constituency profile 
Located in the West-Central Lowlands of Scotland, the constituency lies to the south of the town of Paisley and covers portions of the Renfrewshire and East Renfrewshire council areas. It includes a number of small towns and villages that developed during the industrial revolution, when the chief industry was thread and cotton manufacture in factories powered by the Black Cart Water and small scale coal mining.

The main population centres are the former burghs of Johnstone and Barrhead. The seat also covers the villages of Elderslie, Howwood, Kilbarchan, Lochwinnoch, Neilston and Uplawmoor alongside numerous hamlets.

Member of the Scottish Parliament 

Labour Party politician Hugh Henry won the seat upon its first use in the 2011 Scottish Parliament election, having held its predecessor constituency of Paisley South since 1999. Henry retired from politics prior to the 2016 election, which also saw Tom Arthur gain the seat for the Scottish National Party. Arthur was subsequently re-elected in the 2021 Scottish Parliament election.

Election results

2020s

2010s

2000s: Notional Result
The following is the notional result for the 2007 Scottish Parliament election, as calculated by the BBC.

References

External links

Politics of Renfrewshire
Scottish Parliament constituencies and regions from 2011
Constituencies of the Scottish Parliament
Constituencies established in 2011
2011 establishments in Scotland
Barrhead
Politics of East Renfrewshire
Johnstone
Neilston